Ab Khuda'i or Abzi Khuda'i is a village in the west of Ab Kamari District in Herat Province, of north-west Afghanistan. Its population, consists of approximately 90% Tajik with a small Pashtun, Aimaq and Uzbek minority. Other localities include Alkhan, Anjir, Duzdanak, Gana Gul, Khalifa, and Papal. The village used to be in Badghis Province.

References

Populated places in Badghis Province